Jost Vacano, BVK (born 15 March 1934) is a German retired cinematographer. His work included Das Boot, and he also worked together with director Paul Verhoeven on seven films, including RoboCop and Total Recall. He was also the cinematographer for The Lost Honor of Katharina Blum which he considers his favorite of his own films due to its timeless political message.

Awards
1981 Bavarian Film Award, Best Cinematography

Filmography

Feature films

Television
TV movies
 Die Stühle (1964)
 Mariana Pineda (1965)
 Der Nebbich (1965)
  (1968)
 Ostern (1968)
  (1968)
  (1971)
 Die Brüder Sass, einst Berlins große Ganoven (1972)
 21 Hours at Munich (1976)

TV series
 Tatort:  (1971)
 Tales from the Crypt (1990) (Episode "The Switch")

See also
 List of German-speaking Academy Award winners and nominees

References

External links

SOC 2011 Historical Shot: Das Boot by Jost Vacano

1934 births
German cinematographers
Living people
People from Osnabrück
Film people from Lower Saxony